Marina Savashynskaya Dunbar is a Belarusian artist and entrepreneur. She is known for her modern, abstract paintings. Her artwork has been featured in museums and galleries throughout the United States as well as national and international private and public collections. She studied business and fine art in college and she is currently based in Charleston, South Carolina.

Career 
Marina Savashynskaya Dunbar grew up in Minsk, Belarus up to the age of nine years old. In 2001 she immigrated to Columbus, Georgia with her mother, where she lived and worked for 17 years. She graduated from Columbus State University in 2016 with a Bachelor of Fine Arts. Upon graduating, she moved to Charleston, South Carolina to expand her artistic career.

Work 
Dunbar considers her paintings to be nature-based abstractions, citing movement, harmony and material improvisation as sources of inspiration. Her paintings are multi-layered surfaces, consisting of thin veils of color as well as bold marks and sculptural application of paint. The subject matter of her work is varied, employing nuanced depictions of nature, organic forms and gestural mark-making. Her process is physical, as she manipulates her material across the surface of the canvas using heat, wind, and gravity. Dunbar works in mixed media, experimental sculpture and video.

Dunbar regards Mary Weatherford, Katharina Grosse, Matthew Wong, and Paul Jenkins as admirable artists.

Exhibitions and engagements 

Dunbar has exhibited her work regularly since 2015 in solo and group exhibitions. Her most recent solo exhibitions took place in Atlanta and Charleston with Spalding Nix Fine Art Gallery and the Gibbes Museum of Art. Her recent group exhibitions include shows in Texas, North Carolina, South Carolina, Georgia, Missouri, Oklahoma, Connecticut, Louisiana, Minnesota, and New York. 

Dunbar has been invited to speak regularly throughout the Southeast about her work, artistic process, and career.

References

External links 
 Artist Website

Living people
21st-century American painters
Abstract painters
American contemporary painters
American women painters
21st-century American women artists
Columbus State University alumni
Belarusian emigrants to the United States
Year of birth missing (living people)